Wasu may refer to:
Places
Wasu, Punjab, town of Mandi Bahauddin District, Pakistan
Wasu, Papua New Guinea, a district capital in Morobe Province
Wasu Rural LLG, a local-level government in Morobe Province, Papua New Guinea

Other
Wasu language, an extinct language of Brazil
West African Students' Union
WASU-FM, a radio station owned by Appalachian State University, North Carolina
WASU-LP, a low-power radio station owned by Albany State University, Georgia
Wassu, a Gambian town where the Senegambian stone circles can be found